Colonel Alfred Dyke Acland CBE JP (19 August 1858 – 22 March 1937) was a distinguished British Army officer.

The son of Sir Henry Wentworth Acland by his marriage to Sarah Cotton, Acland was educated at Temple Grove School and Charterhouse School, before being commissioned into the Royal Devon Yeomanry (Territorial Army). He was promoted major on 10 February 1902. He reached the rank of lieutenant colonel in 1910 when he took up command of the Royal Devon Yeomanry. In 1915, during the First World War, he was appointed to command the Base Depot Remounts and was decorated with the Croix de Guerre. In 1917, Acland became assistant director of labour and, in 1918, was appointed the labour commandant of the Australian Corps.

He was invested as a Knight of Justice of the Most Venerable Order of the Hospital of Saint John of Jerusalem, and as a Commander of the Order of the British Empire (CBE) in 1920. He was further a Justice of Peace for Devon.  He was elected a Fellow of the Royal Botanic Society in November 1902.

On 30 July 1885, he married Beatrice Danvers Smith, daughter of W. H. Smith of the bookselling dynasty. They had six children:

Angela Cicely Mary Acland (1888–1953)
Katharine Acland (1892–1966)
Sarah Beatrice Acland (1896–1979) married Cecil Stafford-King-Harman
Lieutenant-Colonel Arthur William Acland (1897–1992)
Peter Bevil Edward Acland (1902–1993)

References

1858 births
1937 deaths
Alfred Dyke
Military personnel from Devon
Younger sons of baronets
People educated at Temple Grove School
British Army personnel of World War I
Commanders of the Order of the British Empire
Recipients of the Croix de Guerre 1914–1918 (France)
Nathaniel Cotton family